The Southern Main Line is a  long standard gauge electrified railway between Malmö and Katrineholm in Sweden. The trains continue further on to Stockholm Central Station along the Western Main Line and terminate there (at platforms 16–19). The line also connects to other lines, most notably in Malmö the Öresund line to Copenhagen, and in Lund to the West Coast Line towards Gothenburg.

History
The first parts of the line opened in 1856 between Malmö and Lund, and the last parts in 1874. An unusual route was chosen as the line passed far from many of the bigger towns at the time, such as Hörby and Kristianstad. This was an attempt to "colonize" the countryside and populate it. Another strategic choice was to put it far from the coast to minimize vulnerability to military attacks. A number of new towns sprung up or grew as the line brought access to the area, such as Eslöv and Hässleholm.

Initially the route Katrineholm–Nässjö was called Eastern Main Line, whereas the original definition of Southern Main Line was kept and thus reserved for Malmö–Nässjö–Falköping.  Not until 1990, the newly founded railway authority Banverket changed the official definition according to modern use.  (Nässjö–Falköping became known as Jönköping Line.)

Present
The line entirely consists of at least double track, with four tracks on the section Malmö–Arlöv.

Stations 
This is a list of stations along the line where the long-distance trains stop:

 Katrineholm
 Norrköping 
 Linköping
 Mjölby
 Nässjö
 Alvesta
 Hässleholm
 Lund
 Malmö

Here is a list of all the stations along the line:

 Katrineholm
 Norrköping
 Kimstad
 Linghem
 Linköping
 Mantorp
 Mjölby
 Tranås
 Aneby
 Nässjö
 Bodafors
 Sävsjö
 Stockaryd
 Lammhult
 Moheda
 Alvesta
 Vislanda
 Diö
 Älmhult
 Killeberg
 Osby
 Ballingslöv
 Hässleholm
 Sösdala
 Tjörnarp
 Höör
 Stehag
 Eslöv
 Örtofta
 Stångby
 Lund
 Hjärup
 Åkarp
 Burlöv
 Malmö

Future
As of 2018, the Arlöv–Lund segment is being rebuilt from two to four tracks. The entire project is expected to be completed in 2024.

Around year 2020–2030 a new high-speed line for 300 or 320 km/h is planned to be opened between Linköping and Södertälje. It is called Ostlänken and will cut travel time by 40 minutes. Both plans are delayed until further notice by the government, both for cost reasons, and awaiting the political discussion of how to improve the railway network.

References

External links
 Trafikverket page on the Southern Main Line 
 Järnväg.net page on Southern Main Line 

 
Railway lines opened in 1856
1856 establishments in Sweden
Rail transport in Östergötland County
Rail transport in Kronoberg County
Rail transport in Skåne County